The Dull Knife Fight, or the Battle on the Red Fork, part of the Great Sioux War of 1876, was a battle that was fought on November 25, 1876, in present-day Johnson County, Wyoming between soldiers and scouts of the United States Army and warriors of the  Northern Cheyenne. The battle essentially ended the Northern Cheyennes' ability to continue the fight for their freedom on the Great Plains.

Background 

After soldiers from Fort Fetterman in Wyoming Territory under Brigadier General George Crook fought the Northern Cheyenne at the Battle of Powder River, on March 17, 1876, the Battle of Prairie Dog Creek on June 9, 1876, the Battle of the Rosebud on June 17, 1876, and the Battle of Slim Buttes on September 9–10, 1876, General Crook received reinforcements at his Goose Creek, Wyoming supply base and began to move up the old Bozeman Trail towards Crazy Horse. After learning of a village of Cheyennes in October, 1876, Crook sent Colonel Ranald S. Mackenzie into the Southern Powder River Country to locate it.

Colonel Mackenzie departed Camp Robinson, Nebraska with nearly 1,000 soldiers in 11 companies of the 2nd, 3rd, 4th, and 5th United States Cavalry Regiments. He also had a large contingent of 400 Indian scouts, including Pawnee led by Li-heris-oo-li-shar, Shoshone led by O-ho-a-tay, Arapaho led by "Sharp Nose", Sioux led by "Three Bears", Bannocks led by Tup-si-paw, and Cheyenne.  The expedition of 1500 officers and men left Fort Fetterman on 14 November 1876, accompanied by four dismounted companies of the 4th Artillery and eleven companies of infantry from the 4th, 9th, 14th and 25th regiments under Colonel Richard I. Dodge, and a medical staff of 6 surgeons.  The Indian scouts "scoured" the front, flank and rear up to 40 miles.  The cavalry then pushed forward, ready to fall back on the infantry if necessary.  A train of some 168 wagons, 7 ambulances, 219 drivers and attendants, 400 mules and 65 packers in the pack-train supplied the column.  They waited out a snow storm at Cantonment Reno until 22 Nov.

The battle 
On 23 Nov., a Cheyenne Indian from the Red Cloud Agency informed the soldiers of an "extremely large" Cheyenne village at the source of Crazy Woman Creek, further upstream from the current US camp, in a Bighorn Mountains canyon.  Col. Mackenzie was ordered to take the Indian scouts, and all of the cavalry except one company, in search of the village.  He led 1000 men, one third of which were Indians.
 
Eventually on November 25, 1876, Mackenzie found the camp of Dull Knife and Little Wolf on the Red Fork of the Powder River. The Cheyenne warriors were having a celebration because of a recent victory over a Shoshone village.

Mackenzie waited until dawn, then attacked and drove the warriors from the village. Some were forced to leave their clothes, blankets and buffalo robes behind and flee into the frozen countryside. Dull Knife began to offer stiff resistance, and the fighting continued. The Pawnee warriors accompanying the soldiers fought with exceptional ability against the Cheyenne. Second Lieutenant John A. McKinney, of the 4th United States Cavalry Regiment, and five enlisted men were Killed in action. Chief Dull Knife's Cheyenne warriors finally retreated, abandoning their village. The Cheyenne village of 200 lodges and all its contents were entirely destroyed, and the soldiers captured about 700 "head of stock".

Aftermath 
Dull Knife lost 3 sons in the fight.  "From the desperate cold of the night immediately following they suffered as much.  Eleven babies froze to death in the arms of famished mothers..."  Finally, the US soldiers recovered articles from the Battle of the Little Bighorn.

Dull Knife's followers were left in the freezing November weather without sufficient clothing, and many suffered from frostbite. In the days that followed, some of the women and children froze to death. Hungry and freezing, many survivors surrendered at Camp Robinson, Nebraska by April 1877. Those who surrendered were exiled to the Southern Cheyenne reservation in Indian Territory. After a year of reservation life in which they were decimated by disease and hunger, many—including Dull Knife and his followers—escaped in what became known as the Northern Cheyenne Exodus.

Other survivors never surrendered. A large number of Dull Knife's band traveled north along the Bighorn Mountains, eventually reaching the upper Tongue River regions. Some joined Chief Crazy Horse's Oglala Sioux camp on Beaver Creek, and on January 8, 1877, would fight alongside Crazy Horse and Two Moon at the Battle of Wolf Mountain on the banks of the Tongue River, in Montana Territory.

The Dull Knife Fight ended the Northern Cheyennes' resistance to the United States for all practical purposes. General Crook telegrammed the War Department, "This will be a terrible blow to the hostiles, as those Cheyennes were not only their bravest warriors but have been the head and front of most all the raids and deviltry committed in this country." There were a few more skirmishes, but by 1884 the Northern Cheyenne people were confined to the Northern Cheyenne Indian Reservation.

Order of battle
Native Americans, Chief's Dull Knife, and Little Coyote (Little Wolf).  About 400 warriors.

United States Army
Expedition from Camp Robinson, Nebraska, October–November, 1876, Late Major General, Colonel Ranald S. Mackenzie, commanding.

Dull Knife battlefield 
 
The Dull Knife Battlefield is located east of the Bighorn Mountains in Johnson County, Wyoming near the present day town of Kaycee, Wyoming. The battlefield is on private land and tours are available only by special arrangement. The location is now the site of a Cattle ranch.

Notes

References
 Dillon, Richard H. North American Indian Wars (1983)
 The Great Sioux War 1876–1877: Dull Knife Battle
 Chronological History of Engagements

Conflicts in 1876
Battles of the Great Sioux War of 1876
Battles involving the Cheyenne
Wyoming Territory
November 1876 events